The Warner Revolution II, also marketed as the Space Walker II, is an American homebuilt aircraft that was designed and produced by Warner Aerocraft of Seminole, Florida. When it was available the aircraft was supplied as a kit or in the form of plans for amateur construction.

The aircraft is intended to be reminiscent of the open cockpit monoplanes of the 1930s, such as the Ryan ST.

Design and development
Developed from the single-seat Warner Revolution I, the Revolution II features a cantilever low wing, a two-seat tandem open cockpit with dual windshields, fixed conventional landing gear with wheel pants and a single engine in tractor configuration.

The aircraft is made from a combination of wood and metal tubing, covered in doped aircraft fabric.

Operational history
In May 2014, 19 examples were registered in the United States with the Federal Aviation Administration, although a total of 30 had been registered at one time.

Specifications (Revolution II)

References

External links

Revolution II
1990s United States sport aircraft
1990s United States ultralight aircraft
1990s United States civil utility aircraft
Single-engined tractor aircraft
Low-wing aircraft
Homebuilt aircraft